Thammanoon Sriroj (born 24 June 1969) is a Thai professional golfer who plays on the Asian Tour. He has five Asian Tour wins and was one of the first ten men to reach one million dollars in Asian Tour career earnings. He has five brothers who are professional golfers and is a cousin of Asian Tour golfer Chawalit Plaphol, with whom he represented Thailand in the 2000 WGC-World Cup.

Professional wins (17)

Asian Tour wins (5)

Asian Tour playoff record (1–2)

Japan Challenge Tour wins (1)

Asian Development Tour wins (1)

1Co-sanctioned by the Taiwan PGA Tour

All Thailand Golf Tour wins (9)
2001 Singha Masters
2002 Prayudh Mahagitsiri Cup, Singha Masters
2005 Singha Masters, Cotto Open
2006 Chevrolet Championship
2009 Singha Masters, Singha Classic
2013 Singha Chiang Mai Open1
1Co-sanctioned by the ASEAN PGA Tour

Other wins (1)
1996 Thai PGA Championship

Results in major championships

CUT = missed the halfway cut
Note: Sriroj only played in The Open Championship.

Team appearances
World Cup (representing Thailand): 1995, 2000
Dynasty Cup (representing Asia): 2003 (winners), 2005 (winners)

See also
List of golfers with most Asian Tour wins

External links

Thammanoon Sriroj
Asian Tour golfers
1969 births
Living people